Marathon High School is a public high school located in Marathon, Cortland County, New York, U.S.A., and is the only high school operated by the Marathon Central School District.

Footnotes

External links

1925 establishments in New York (state)
Educational institutions established in 1925
Public high schools in New York (state)
School buildings completed in 1925
Schools in Cortland County, New York